is a Japanese dinosaur-themed tokusatsu/kaiju television series, produced by P Productions and ran on the Fuji Television Network from October 2, 1967 to March 25, 1968, lasting a total of twenty-six episodes.

Characters

Heroes
Takeru Ibuki: The main character. A young boy who befriends a brontosaurus.

Nessie: A young brontosaurus whose parents died and is now fighting the aliens who killed her parents, with the help of the Japanese military and her human friend. possesses great physical strength and much like her father, the ability to fire a steam of flames.

Villains
Aliens (group 1): a group of bizarre gargoyle aliens serves as the show's antagonists. they were killed and defeated in episode 14. they possess various unnamed guns and missile-shooters, as well as the strange power to resurrect fossilized creatures.

Aliens (group 2): a different, more powerful group of fly-like aliens appeared in episodes 15-26. These aliens possess more advanced weapons, being able to fire an unidentified yellow paste-like acid from their snouts, and being able to alter their revived creatures' genetic material and turn them into giants.

External links

 https://www.imdb.com/title/tt0185090/

1967 Japanese television series debuts
1968 Japanese television series endings
Tokusatsu television series
Television series about dinosaurs
Japanese television series with live action and animation